North Peace River was a provincial electoral district in the Canadian province of British Columbia. It was first contested in the general election of 1956 and last contested in the general election of 1986. It and neighbouring South Peace River were formed by the partition of the old Peace River riding. Redistribution in advance of the 1991 election saw North Peace River adjusted and renamed Peace River North.

History

Election results 

|-

|Liberal
|John William Belesaigne Baker
|align="right"|423 		 	
|align="right"|20.71%
|align="right"|
|align="right"|unknown

|Co-operative Commonwealth Fed.
|Vera Agnes Loucks
|align="right"|359 	 			
|align="right"|17.58%
|align="right"|
|align="right"|unknown

|- bgcolor="white"
!align="right" colspan=3|Total valid votes
!align="right"|2,042 
!align="right"|100.00%
!align="right"|
|- bgcolor="white"
!align="right" colspan=3|Total rejected ballots
!align="right"|80
!align="right"|
!align="right"|
|- bgcolor="white"
!align="right" colspan=3|Turnout
!align="right"|%
!align="right"|
!align="right"|
|- bgcolor="white"
|}

|-

|Liberal
|John William Belesaigne Baker
|align="right"|958 				          
|align="right"|26.81%
|align="right"|
|align="right"|unknown

|Co-operative Commonwealth Fed.
|John Gordon Curtis
|align="right"|769 	
|align="right"|21.52%
|align="right"|
|align="right"|unknown

|Progressive Conservative
|Wilbert Daniel Bowes
|align="right"|114 		
|align="right"|3.19% 
|align="right"|
|align="right"|unknown
}
|Independents
|Robert Lyle Angus
|align="right"|81 				          
|align="right"|2.27%
|align="right"|
|align="right"|unknown
|- bgcolor="white"
!align="right" colspan=3|Total valid votes
!align="right"|3,573
!align="right"|100.00%
!align="right"|
|- bgcolor="white"
!align="right" colspan=3|Total rejected ballots
!align="right"|57
!align="right"|
!align="right"|
|- bgcolor="white"
!align="right" colspan=3|Turnout
!align="right"|%
!align="right"|
!align="right"|
|}

|-

|Liberal
|Daniel Gilchrist Murray
|align="right"|603 	 	
|align="right"|18.12%
|align="right"|
|align="right"|unknown

|- bgcolor="white"
!align="right" colspan=3|Total valid votes
!align="right"|3,327
!align="right"|100.00%
!align="right"|
|- bgcolor="white"
!align="right" colspan=3|Total rejected ballots
!align="right"|34
!align="right"|
!align="right"|
|- bgcolor="white"
!align="right" colspan=3|Turnout
!align="right"|%
!align="right"|
!align="right"|
|- bgcolor="white"
!align="right" colspan=7|*  <small>Listed as Dan George in Statement of Votes. 
|}	  	  	  

|-

|Independent
|Jacob Francis Huhn
|align="right"|583 			 	 	
|align="right"|15.70%
|align="right"|
|align="right"|unknown

|Liberal
|Leith Douglas Boulter
|align="right"|565 			 	 	
|align="right"|15.21%
|align="right"|
|align="right"|unknown

|Independent
|Robert Lyle Angus
|align="right"|256 			 	 	
|align="right"|6.89%
|align="right"|
|align="right"|unknown
|- bgcolor="white"
!align="right" colspan=3|Total valid votes
!align="right"|3,714  	
!align="right"|100.00%
!align="right"|
|- bgcolor="white"
!align="right" colspan=3|Total rejected ballots
!align="right"|35
!align="right"|
!align="right"|
|- bgcolor="white"
!align="right" colspan=3|Turnout
!align="right"|%
!align="right"|
!align="right"|
|}  	  	  	 

|-

|Liberal
|Leith Douglas Boulter
|align="right"|484 	 			 	 	
|align="right"|9.14%
|align="right"|
|align="right"|unknown
|- bgcolor="white"
!align="right" colspan=3|Total valid votes
!align="right"|5,294 		
!align="right"|100.00%
!align="right"|
|- bgcolor="white"
!align="right" colspan=3|Total rejected ballots
!align="right"|49
!align="right"|
!align="right"|
|- bgcolor="white"
!align="right" colspan=3|Turnout
!align="right"|%
!align="right"|
!align="right"|
|}  	

|-

|Progressive Conservative
|Derril Laverne Leahy
|align="right"|1,560 		 		 	
|align="right"|23.90%
|align="right"|
|align="right"|unknown

|Liberal
|William John Herdy
|align="right"|265 		 	 	
|align="right"|4.06%
|align="right"|
|align="right"|unknown
|- bgcolor="white"
!align="right" colspan=3|Total valid votes
!align="right"|6,528 	
!align="right"|100.00%
!align="right"|
|- bgcolor="white"
!align="right" colspan=3|Total rejected ballots
!align="right"|87
!align="right"|
!align="right"|
|- bgcolor="white"
!align="right" colspan=3|Turnout
!align="right"|%
!align="right"|
!align="right"|
|}  		 

|-

|Liberal
|Desmond Martin
|align="right"|251 	 	 	 	 	
|align="right"|3.37%
|align="right"|
|align="right"|unknown
|- bgcolor="white"
!align="right" colspan=3|Total valid votes
!align="right"|7,438 	
!align="right"|100.00%
!align="right"|
|- bgcolor="white"
!align="right" colspan=3|Total rejected ballots
!align="right"|96
!align="right"|
!align="right"|
|- bgcolor="white"
!align="right" colspan=3|Turnout
!align="right"|%
!align="right"|
!align="right"|
|} 

|-

|- bgcolor="white"
!align="right" colspan=3|Total valid votes
!align="right"|8,679	
!align="right"|100.00%
!align="right"|
|- bgcolor="white"
!align="right" colspan=3|Total rejected ballots
!align="right"|147
!align="right"|
!align="right"|
|- bgcolor="white"
!align="right" colspan=3|Turnout
!align="right"|%
!align="right"|
!align="right"|
|}

|-

|Liberal
|David Charles Parkinson
|align="right"|240 			
|align="right"|2.16%
|align="right"|
|align="right"|unknown
|- bgcolor="white"
!align="right" colspan=3|Total valid votes
!align="right"|11,117 	
!align="right"|100.00%
!align="right"|
|- bgcolor="white"
!align="right" colspan=3|Total rejected ballots
!align="right"|108
!align="right"|
!align="right"|
|- bgcolor="white"
!align="right" colspan=3|Turnout
!align="right"|%
!align="right"|
!align="right"|
|}

|-

|Progressive Conservative
|Ian Bernard MacKenzie
|align="right"|511 	 	 		 	
|align="right"|5.40%
|align="right"|
|align="right"|unknown

|Liberal
|Jill C. Moore
|align="right"|277 				
|align="right"|2.93%
|align="right"|
|align="right"|unknown
|- bgcolor="white"
!align="right" colspan=3|Total valid votes
!align="right"|9,461 	
!align="right"|100.00%
!align="right"|
|- bgcolor="white"
!align="right" colspan=3|Total rejected ballots
!align="right"|139
!align="right"|
!align="right"|
|- bgcolor="white"
!align="right" colspan=3|Turnout
!align="right"|%
!align="right"|
!align="right"|
|}

External links 
 Elections BC website - historical election data

Former provincial electoral districts of British Columbia
Peace River Country